August W. Laabs (October 26, 1873 – December 23, 1941) was an American farmer, businessman, and politician who served as a member of the Wisconsin State Assembly from 1933 to 1935.

Early life 
Born in Milwaukee, Wisconsin, Laabs was worked as a telegraph operator and was a train dispatcher for the Chicago and North Western Transportation Company.

Career 
He lived in Appleton, Wisconsin and owned the Wisconsin Rendering Company. Laabs also owned several farms and was in the real estate business. Laabs served as chairman of the Grand Chute, Wisconsin Town Board and on the Appleton Common Council. He also served on the Outagamie County, Wisconsin Board of Supervisors. In 1933 and 1935, Laabs served in the Wisconsin State Assembly as a Republican.

Death 
Laabs died of heart disease in Appleton, Wisconsin.

Notes

1873 births
1941 deaths
Politicians from Appleton, Wisconsin
Politicians from Milwaukee
Businesspeople from Wisconsin
Farmers from Wisconsin
Mayors of places in Wisconsin
Wisconsin city council members
Republican Party members of the Wisconsin State Assembly
People from Grand Chute, Wisconsin